Cumberland Packing Corporation is a privately owned company located at 2 Cumberland Street, in Brooklyn, New York City. It was founded in 1945 by Benjamin Eisenstadt and is best known as the manufacturer, distributor, and marketer of Sweet'n Low, the saccharin-based zero-calorie sweetener sold in pink packets.

Background
Cumberland Packing began as a tea bag factory prior to the invention of Sweet'n Low. Using modified tea bagging equipment, the company was the first to sell sugar in packets, breaking tradition with sugar bowls that were common on restaurant tabletops at the time.

The company received Federal Trademark Registration Number 1,000,000 for the Sweet'n Low musical scale logo. There have been over 500 billion Sweet'n Low packets produced.

In the early 1970s, Ben Eisenstadt's son, Marvin Eisenstadt, launched the Sugar in the Raw brand. Cumberland has expanded its In the Raw line of natural products to include Stevia in the Raw, a zero-calorie stevia-based sweetener; Agave in the Raw, a 100% organic agave nectar; and Monk Fruit in the Raw, a zero-calorie sweetener made from the vine-ripened monk fruit. In 2014, the company launched an eco-friendly baking alternative to refined white sugar with Sugar in the Raw Organic White.

In the late 1970s, Cumberland Packing Corp. bought the rights to concentrated dairy-flavor formulas called Butter Buds, and added the Butter Buds Food Ingredients division, producing all-natural, fat- and cholesterol-free butter-flavored granules. On January 1, 2013, the company completed an internal corporate reorganization, whereby the Butter Buds Food Ingredients Division became separately incorporated as Butter Buds, Inc. As a result, Cumberland Packing Corp. and Butter Buds, Inc. are now part of the Cumberland Worldwide Holdings, Inc. affiliated group.

Cumberland Packing produces other tabletop sweeteners, including NatraTaste, an aspartame-based zero-calorie sweetener; NatraTaste Gold, a sucralose-based zero-calorie sweetener; and Sweet One, a zero-calorie sweetener made with acesulfame potassium. In addition to sweetener products, Cumberland Packing produces a sodium-free salt substitute, known as Nu-Salt.

References

External links
 

Companies based in New York City
Packaging companies of the United States